Ramakuppam is a village in Chittoor district of the Indian state of Andhra Pradesh. It is the mandal headquarters of Ramakuppam mandal. It is under Kuppam Revenue Division.

References 

Villages in Chittoor district
Mandal headquarters in Chittoor district